Matsumuraja capitophoroides is an aphid in the superfamily Aphidoidea in the order Hemiptera. It is a true bug and sucks sap from plants. It is one of the two endemic aphid species of Sri Lanka. The species was first described by Dick Hille Ris Lambers in 1966.

References 

 http://animaldiversity.org/accounts/Matsumuraja_capitophoroides/classification/
 http://aphid.speciesfile.org/Common/basic/Taxa.aspx?TaxonNameID=1170302
 

Macrosiphini
Agricultural pest insects
Arthropods of Sri Lanka